The following is a list of Villanova Wildcats football seasons.

Seasons

# denotes interim head coach

References

 
Villanova
Villanova Wildcats football seasons